The National Front for Salvation, is a Tunisian political coalition of different political parties the largest party in the coalition is the Tunisian National Movement . Its president and co-founder Touhami Abdouli won a seat in the district of Sidi Bouzid in the parliamentary election of 2014.
The coalition ceased to exist after 3 months.

References

Political parties with year of establishment missing
Political party alliances in Tunisia